Mother Gothel is a fictional character who appears in Walt Disney Pictures' 50th animated feature film Tangled (2010). The character is voiced by actress and singer Donna Murphy in her voice acting debut; Murphy auditioned for the role spontaneously upon learning from her agent that Disney was auditioning actresses for the film's villainous role. Loosely based on Dame Gothel in the German fairy tale "Rapunzel", Mother Gothel is a vain old woman who hoards the strong healing powers of a magical gold flower to live for many, many years and remain perpetually young and beautiful. When the flower is harvested to heal the kingdom's ailing queen, its powers are inherited by the king and the queen's daughter Rapunzel, removing Gothel's access. With her life suddenly endangered, Gothel kidnaps the infant, imprisoning the princess in an isolated tower for eighteen years while posing as her mother to exploit her powers.

Inspired by Disney villainesses such as the Evil Queen and Lady Tremaine from Snow White and the Seven Dwarfs (1937) and Cinderella (1950), respectively, Gothel was developed by screenwriter Dan Fogelman into a more original, complex villain than the witch upon whom she is based because the character is forced to rely solely on her wit, charisma and intelligence as opposed to sorcery to survive. The film's most difficult character to develop, Gothel's appearance, whose beauty, dark curly hair and voluptuous figure were deliberately designed to serve as a foil to Rapunzel's, was inspired by the appearance of Murphy herself and American singer Cher.

Mother Gothel has been mostly well received by film critics, who enjoyed the character's humor, complexity, charisma and showmanship, dubbing her a scene stealer, while praising Murphy's performance enthusiastically. However, some critics argued that Gothel was too passive, dismissing her as a weaker, less intimidating Disney villainess than Maleficent from Sleeping Beauty (1959) and Cruella de Vil from One Hundred and One Dalmatians (1961).

Development

Conception and creation 
Walt Disney himself first attempted to adapt the fairy tale "Rapunzel" into a feature-length animated film during the 1940s. However, the filmmaker's efforts were never fully realized because the fairy tale was considered too "small". In 2008, co-directors Nathan Greno and Byron Howard decided to enlarge the film's scale to transform it into a "big event" for it to be successful. Meanwhile, the character Mother Gothel was developed into a much more complex villain than the witch upon whom she is based, conceiving her as "a very lonely woman who really did not know how to have a relationship of any kind". Little else had been determined about the character at the time, who was simply described as "the type of woman who ... envisioned herself in the spotlight." A departure from traditional Disney Villains, Mother Gothel is not a witch or a sorceress. Because she lacks supernatural powers, the character is forced to rely solely on her wit, charm, intellect and charisma, a conscious decision made by Greno and Howard. However, in the Brothers Grimm's original fairy tale, Gothel is very much depicted as a typical witch-like character, an idea that was modified for the Disney film adaptation in favor of having Gothel's agelessness instead be "derive[d] ... from Rapunzel's hair."

Seeking inspiration for Gothel and Rapunzel's "bizarre" relationship, Greno and Howard conducted a series of interviews with several female Disney employees, asking them to list qualities in their mothers that "they found annoying and cloying or restricting", specifically "the things that their mothers would do that made them feel trapped or made them feel smothered" to make the villain appear more relatable. Gothel's "Mother Knows Best" line "Getting kind of chubby" was in fact borrowed from one of these interviews. Gothel embodies "the darker side" of overprotective parents; at the beginning of the film, Gothel and Rapunzel's relationship resembles more-so of "a pure mother-daughter relationship." Elaborating on Gothel's "unique mothering style", Howard explained to Den of Geek that the character "has to convince this smart girl that she is her mother ... whatever her motivations are." Citing Gothel as one of the film's most difficult characters to develop as a result of her complex relationship with Rapunzel, Greno explained to Den of Geek:

The St. Paul Pioneer Press observed that Gothel represents "an update" of the traditional wicked stepmother, evolving into "the passive-aggressive stepmother" instead. In actress Donna Murphy's opinion, a "classic" villainess is "somebody who wants something with such intensity and such great need but comes to a place of not being bound by any kind of moral code or any sense of what's ethical", concluding that "They will do anything to get what they want".  The Austin Chronicle observed that the directors' inclusion of Gothel as "an evil mother figure as a trigger for the storyline" remains one of the "classic hallmarks of Disney animation".

Voice 

The directors admitted that they were not keen on hiring solely big-named, A-list celebrities or top-billed actors to voice the film's main characters. Howard explained that, to be cast, the actors simply had to have the "right voice" for the characters, preferring voice actors "who could ... bring a natural ease to those characters." Greno elaborated, "It was never about how big the star was ... It was always about ... who's best for the part". Film critic James Berardinelli of ReelViews observed that this decision echoed "Disney's approach during the late 1980s and early 1990s, when big name stars were often bypassed in favor of lesser known talents." An additional asset was that the actor be able to perform well both independently and collaboratively.

Mother Gothel is voiced by American actress and singer Donna Murphy, a Tony Award-winning Broadway actress who was informed about the casting call for Tangled by her agent. Having never voiced an animated character before, the actress decided to audition for the role of the film's villain based solely on the expectation that the unfamiliar experience would be "fun". Almost immediately, Murphy developed a strong liking towards Gothel because of the character's complexity. Known for her award-winning Broadway performances, Murphy prepared herself for her Tangled audition similar to the way in which the actress would have prepared for a Broadway audition. Refusing to rely solely on her voice, Murphy also provided Gothel with an additional background that "flush[ed] out the moments beyond what we see in the film." Although Greno and Howard had already held Murphy in high regard as "a spectacular singer", the actress was required to audition a song for the directors nonetheless, performing "Children Will Listen" from the musical Into the Woods. Howard revealed in an interview that Murphy was ultimately chosen out of hundreds of actresses because she possessed "something extra"; the directors especially enjoyed the charisma and intelligence Murphy brought to the role.

Growing up a fan of Disney films, Murphy had never wanted to play a princess, preferring characters who were adventurous and "drove the action" instead. In the actress' opinion, villains continue to be the most dynamic characters in Disney films. Describing the opportunity to voice a Disney villain as a "juicy" experience, Murphy explained that this is because these characters are "not bound by ethics or moral codes or concern for what someone thinks or how it might hurt someone else", providing actors with more freedom. Upon her first session, Murphy appreciated the directors for exposing her to early concepts and ideas about Gothel. However, Murphy was not provided with a complete script because "They’re very protective about that." Murphy was directed to lower the pitch of her voice in favor of demonstrating a rather "flat" sound. Although Murphy did not base her own performance on any one individual in particular, she admitted to Babble that she was somewhat inspired by Betty Lou Gerson's performance as Cruella de Vil in Disney's One Hundred and One Dalmatians (1961). Comparing voice acting to Broadway, Murphy commented that, in animation, "You’re recording and you’re discovering it and giving the performance all at the same time. It's not like you have three weeks rehearsal." Additionally, Murphy never worked with co-star Mandy Moore, voice of Rapunzel; instead, Murphy revealed that scenes with Gothel and Rapunzel were actually recorded opposite one of the directors impersonating Moore, who also explained to Murphy that Gothel's design will continue to evolve as the character begins to adapt the actress' mannerisms. Howard enthused that Murphy "nailed" Gothel, admitting to ultimately using 90% of the actress' original material and takes because "The character just came right to life when she came in."

Characterization, design and analysis 

Convinced that "Disney does villains better than anyone," the directors felt pressured to create a villain who would ultimately "live up to the classic villains of [Disney's] past films." Greno and Howard wanted Gothel to be both a funny and frightening character, describing her as "a commanding and powerful presence ... who could also have warmth". Greno believes that Gothel is particularly scary because she is not a witch, explaining, "She's a real-world-type villain." Considered "one of the [film's] hardest characters to crack" by Greno, he and Howard wanted Gothel to be depicted as a conniving villain who is likeable and charismatic enough that audiences would be convinced by her and Rapunzel's unconventional relationship. Greno explained, "if Mother Gothel was a mean villainess, and looked like a villainess and acted scary, you'd be like, 'Why is Rapunzel staying in the tower?'" In early drafts, Gothel was inspired by Ursula from The Little Mermaid (1989), causing the character to become "too dark." Ultimately, the filmmakers voted in favor of having Gothel be subtle as opposed to having her remain "a one-note, domineering mother," similar to Lady Tremaine, Cinderella's cruel stepmother, from Disney's Cinderella (1950).

As reported by The Korea Times, the thought of Gothel being a villain who is both a "greedy, selfish woman and a mother figure to Rapunzel" was initially "perplexing" for animator Jin Kim, and it wasn't until after Kim heard Gothel's "Mother Knows Best" for the first time that he "came up with the 1940s Hollywood screen siren motif" for the character. The directors also strived to make it obvious that Mother Gothel and Rapunzel are not related. Greno told Animation World Network, "When they're standing together, it is very clear that this is not a mother and daughter, just by the frames of their bodies, their hair, the pigments of their skin," as opposed to when Rapunzel is in close proximity with her true parents, the King and Queen. Howard added that, in comparison to Rapunzel, "Gothel is very tall and curvy, she's very voluptuous, she's got this very exotic look to her. Even down to that curly hair, we’re trying to say visually that this is not this girl's mother." The animators studied footage of Murphy to get "ideas about facial expressions" and "gestures." After much speculation, the directors finally admitted that, in addition to Murphy, Gothel's physical appearance was in fact influenced by American singer Cher. Howard explained that this was "because Cher is very exotic and Gothic looking," continuing that the singer "definitely was one of the people we looked at visually, as far as what gives you a striking character."

Because Mother Gothel is constantly lying to and belittling Rapunzel, the terms gaslighting and passive-aggressive has since gone on to be commonly associated with Gothel. Critics felt that Gothel could possibly pioneer "a new kind of Disney villainess," introducing "the undermining, passive-aggressive, guilt-trip-inducing witch." The Village Voice wrote that, as a villain, Gothel "is Disney's first villainess whose chief crime is being an underminer," warning Rapunzel that she is simply "too silly, too uneducated, too unsophisticated" to survive life outside of the tower. The Los Angeles Times referred to Gothel as "A guilt-tripping, overprotective, super-manipulative parent from hell." One film critic observed that "Gothel is one of the most understated villains Disney has used in a long time. She harkens back to the wicked step mother idea in Cinderella ... She proves it's possible to be evil without all the theatrics." The author continued, "Gothel is one for the ages with a bit of darkly comedic timing and the overall greed and menace a villain needs to be disdained." The character has received comparisons to the Evil Queen, Snow White's stepmother, from Disney's Snow White and the Seven Dwarfs (1937).

Donna Murphy believed that Gothel did really love Rapunzel in her own way.

Music 
Mother Gothel performs two of the film's songs: "Mother Knows Best," described as a "brassy, Broadway-targeted tune" and an "authoritarian anthem" in which Gothel warns her daughter "all about the evils out to get Rapunzel," and "Mother Knows Best (Reprise)," both written by composer Alan Menken and lyricist Glenn Slater. While making Rapunzel's music more modern in the vein of a singer-songwriter, "young and contemporary and fresh," Menken decided to make Gothel's songs "more classic Broadway," described as more of "a big stage diva type" of music. Critics have observed similarities between "Mother Knows Best" and "Out There" from Disney's The Hunchback of Notre Dame (1996), on which Menken also served as a composer.

Musically, the filmmakers "were open ... to ideas that [Murphy] had," as the actress had felt different about "a slightly different ending to something musically in the arrangement," requesting to try something else, to which the filmmakers responded, "Absolutely!"

Appearances

Tangled
Mother Gothel appears in Tangled (2010). For hundreds of years, Gothel hoarded the rejuvenation powers of a magical golden flower to remain young and beautiful, while keeping the flower's existence a secret from the rest of the world. However, when the pregnant Queen of Corona falls fatally ill, the flower is desperately retrieved and fed to her, healing her and in turn inadvertently stripping Gothel of her access to the only thing keeping her alive. The King and Queen's newborn daughter Rapunzel is gifted with the flower's abilities, which manifest via her golden hair when a special song is sung. Gothel cuts the baby's hair in an attempt to use it for her own needs, but kidnaps Rapunzel when she discovers that the hair turns brown and powerless once cut. She then raises Rapunzel as her daughter in an isolated tower for eighteen years.

As her eighteenth birthday approaches, Rapunzel wishes to leave the tower to view the "floating lights", lanterns released annually by the King and Queen in remembrance of their lost daughter. Gothel forbids this, but agrees to Rapunzel's request to take a three-day journey to retrieve art supplies for Rapunzel's birthday. Her absence gives Rapunzel enough time to escape the tower, aided by a wanted thief named Flynn Rider. Gothel quickly realizes Rapunzel has gone missing, and begins pursuing Rapunzel and Flynn.

Enlisting the help of the Stabbington brothers, a duo of thieves who were once betrayed by Flynn, Gothel offers them both revenge on Flynn Rider and the use of Rapunzel's gift once they agree to help her find them, not intending to keep the latter part of her promise as she wants Rapunzel for herself. When her initial attempt to convince Rapunzel to return home with her fails, Gothel tricks the brothers into immobilizing Flynn and leaving him to be captured by the royal guard. She stages a rescue by knocking the brothers unconscious when they attempt to kidnap Rapunzel. 

Convincing Rapunzel that Flynn has betrayed her, they return to the tower. As Flynn escapes from the dungeon, Rapunzel suddenly realizes her true identity and rebels against Gothel, only to be chained and gagged. Gothel fatally stabs Flynn upon his arrival and attempts to leave with Rapunzel, who offers to go willingly with her if she can heal Flynn. Gothel reluctantly releases her. However, Flynn unexpectedly cuts Rapunzel's hair, causing it to lose its magic and turn brown. Failing to salvage the hair, Gothel falls from the tower's window and disintegrates into dust. Flynn succumbs to his wound and dies in Rapunzel's arms, but is miraculously returned to life by Rapunzel's tears, and she is finally reunited with her biological parents.

Tangled: Before Ever After
Having died six months prior to the film's events, Mother Gothel appears in the 2D Tangled: Before Ever After as a painting in Rapunzel's mural on her bedchamber walls. Eugene (Flynn Rider) described how she had hoarded the mystical healing powers of the golden Sundrop Flower to sustain her youth and beauty and how she had stolen the infant princess and kept her locked up in a tower for eighteen long years. She is last mentioned when Eugene had saved Rapunzel from her wrath, which had resulted in him being stabbed to death by her silver knife.

A few days later, when the coronation ceremony was interrupted by the arrival of the notorious criminal Lady Cain had told Rapunzel that she had no idea who she was dealing with, to which Rapunzel replied that she has "dealt with much worse", referencing her experience with Gothel,

Rapunzel's Tangled Adventure
She appears in a nightmare Princess Rapunzel had, in "What the Hair!?" after her seventy-feet long magical blonde hair had mysteriously returned nearly a week ago. She had bragged about how Rapunzel thought that she was "gone forever" and had expressed her wicked delight in seeing that her "daughter's" golden hair and its mystical properties had returned. She then comfortingly told Rapunzel that she came back to bring her back to her tower, where she would be "safe and secure." It was then that the black rock spikes, which resulted in the regrowth of Rapunzel's 70-feet golden hair, appear all around her.

In "The Quest for Varian", a smug Eugene had shown Maximus the window of the tower was "where Mother Gothel fell to her doom."

In "The Alchemist Returns", Princess Rapunzel says to her father King Fredric that he is not the first person to lie to her and say that she is not ready for the real world, as a reference to her adopted mother.

In the second season's episode "Rapunzel: Day One", Gothel is referenced by an amnesic Rapunzel who, having lost her memories, naturally thinks that Gothel is her mother. She excitedly pointed out to Cassandra that she should "try the special spice Mother makes".
 
She reappeared in "Rapunzeltopia" in a nightmare created by the evil magic of Tromus the Eternal, one of the ghostly disciples of the dark sorcerer Zhan Tiri. In "Lost and Found", a flashback of Lord Demantius' implies that Gothel was formerly one of his three disciples who had double-crossed him to his longtime archenemy Zhan Tiri.

In the first half of the final season premiere "Rapunzel's Return", Cassandra encountered a child-like spirit later revealed to be Zhan Tiri. Zhan Tiri reveals to Cassandra that she is Gothel's biological daughter, showing her the events following the newborn Rapunzel's abduction where Gothel abandoned her four-year old Cassandra when the Captain of Royal Guard stumbled across her cottage with him adopting the girl. Zhan Tiri exploits that resentment to turn Cassandra on her friends, lashing out at her adopted father in "Islands Apart" for hiding the truth of her mother from her. She also lashes at Rapunzel in the 2-part episode "Cassandra's Revenge", sarcastically stating to Rapunzel that they should "have a chat" about her mother choosing Rapunzel over her own flesh and blood. Rapunzel tried to explain that Gothel had abducted her and held her against her will, that it was not her decision. Still incensed, Cassandra asked if it was her decision to push her out a window.

In "A Tale of Two Sisters", it is said that Gothel's restless spirit now haunts the cottage where she had lived with a young Cassandra before deserting her. A curious Cassandra and Rapunzel go to investigate these rumors, but it is actually a ruse by the Enchanted Girl (Zhan Tiri) to further push the human hosts of the Sundrop Flower and Moonstone Opal apart. By further exploring, the two women find out that Gothel had a diary of sorts in the form of magic mirrors, that displayed her overly narcissistic self and disdain for her young daughter Cassandra. A painting of her is seen above the fireplace before it was burned by green fire. A missing broken hand mirror then showed a seemingly loving memory of Gothel expressing her motherly affection toward Cassandra but was, in truth, hiding the fact that she had only said such sweet words to keep Cassandra out of her hair for awhile, as she always considered her own child a "lousy, little pest."

In other media

Merchandise 
In addition to the popular Mother Gothel Classic Doll and appearing alongside Rapunzel, Flynn, Pascal and Maximus in the Rapunzel Tangled Figure Play Set, the character's likeness has since been adapted and modified by Disney into a much more glamorous doll for sale alongside several re-imagined Disney villainesses as part of the company's Disney Villains Designer Collection, released in 2012. Costumed in a long burgundy gown made of satin, Gothel wears her thick black hair in "a theatrical up-do."

Once Upon a Time
Mother Gothel appears on the ABC television series Once Upon a Time, portrayed by actress Emma Booth. She débuts in the seventh season and is one of the main antagonists. This version is a dryad who inherits the title of Mother Nature from the previous Queen of the Dryads named Mother Flora (portrayed by Gabrielle Miller) following a massacre on the dryads. She is the mother of Alice with the Captain Hook of the Wish Realm and became a powerful witch who is the leader of the Coven of the Eight. In Hyperion Heights, she is an accomplice of Drizella and is known as Eloise Gardener.

Video games

Disney Magic Kingdoms
Mother Gothel appears as a playable character in the video game Disney Magic Kingdoms. Before being unlocked, she acts as the third enemy boss in the game's main storyline.

Kingdom Hearts
Mother Gothel made her debut appearance in the Kingdom Hearts series in Kingdom Hearts III, with Murphy reprising her role in the English version. Her role plays out as in the film, but here, she strikes an alliance with the True Organization XIII in exchange for bringing Rapunzel back to the tower. But after she restrains Rapunzel and attacks Eugene, they conclude that her extreme darkness could destroy her world and turn her into a Heartless called the Grim Guardianess to use in the Second Keyblade War, but she is quickly vanquished by Sora.

Books

Mother Knows Best: A Tale of the Old Witch

In the fifth book in the Villains series by author Serena Valentino, Gothel lives in the Dead Woods alongside her sisters Primrose and Hazel and their mother Manea.  In order to obtain the skills of magic, the sisters must drink their mother's blood.  During the ceremony, Manea threatens to kill both Primrose and Hazel, and in response Gothel sets fire to her and the magical rapunzel flowers that grant youth and health.  One flower survives.  Soon the vengeful spirit of Manea attacks Gothel and her sisters.  While Gothel survives and banishes her mother's spirit once and for all, her sisters get sick and weak.  The Odd Sisters arrive in the Woods and claim they wish to help Gothel heal her sisters.  But despite this promise, Hazel and Primrose die.  Using dark magic and the one flower, Gothel and the Odd Sisters put Primrose and Hazel into a kind of stasis, even though Hazel and Primrose beg Gothel to let them die. Gothel succumbs to sleep while their loyal servant, Jacob, buries Primrose and Hazel in a grave and uses the one flower left to keep Gothel alive for years. 

Gothel awakens after many years once Jacob is instructed by the Odd Sisters to do so.  Gothel finds out the King of Corona has sent a force to the Dead Woods to obtain the last golden flower for his sick queen.  Gothel flees to a cottage far away, along with the bodies of her two sisters that have been kept in stasis all this time.  At the cottage she once again encounters the Odd Sisters. Lucinda goes out into the village nearby and hires a housekeeper, Mrs. Tiddlebottom.  The sisters then depart. Soon the forces of Corona come to the cottage, seeking the flower again.  Gothel hides while Mrs. Tiddlebottom distracts the soldiers, but loses the flower in the process.  Gothel then goes and kidnaps the baby Rapunzel.  However, Gothel does not have a hand in raising her, and Mrs. Tiddlebottom, alongside a nanny named Mrs. Lovelace, raises her till her eighth birthday.

On Rapunzel's eighth birthday, the Odd Sisters come to find Gothel has gone totally mad.  She is dressing like the sisters and claims she is one of them.  While the sisters are stunned and put off by this, they agree to help Gothel by attempting to use Rapunzel's hair to resurrect Primrose and Hazel.  Mrs. Lovelace walks in and discovers them, screaming in the middle of the dark ceremony.  As a result, Mrs Lovelace is killed, Mrs Tiddlebottom's memory is wiped, and the Odd Sisters put Rapunzel and her new pet Pascal to sleep.  Gothel stores them in a tower and for the next decade Rapunzel sleeps, unaware that rather than having a happy childhood, she has been asleep the whole time, with Gothel using her hair to keep herself young. 

Following the events of the previous book, the Odd Sisters are trapped in the realm of mirrors. When Gothel reaches out to them, they reveal Rapunzel has awakened, and that they cannot help Gothel.  When Gothel snaps at them in anger, the sisters refuse to help, and watch what transpires from their mirrors.  Through their influence, Flynn Rider arrives at the tower while Gothel is away to check on her sisters, and he and Rapunzel escape. The events after this mirror those of the film, as the Odd Sisters watch with glee as Gothel eventually dies when Flynn cuts Rapunzel's hair and she falls out of the tower, turning to dust.  

In the sixth book The Odd Sisters, it is revealed she is the younger sister of the Odd Sisters, having been born following the events that led to the creation of the Odd Sisters.

Reception 
Mother Gothel has garnered mostly positive reviews from film critics. Nigel Andrews of the Financial Times felt that the character was given the film's "best lines and tunes". Film4 described Gothel as a "fun" character "to the extent that she risks making the good guys seem a bit dull." Hailing Gothel as the film's "pièce de résistance", Georgie Hobbs of Little White Lies wrote that Gothel "performs ... 'Mother Knows Best' ... with a schizophrenic frenzy worthy of the very best of [Stephen] Sondheim's crazed heroines". IGN's Jim Vejvoda penned, "Mother Gothel nearly steals the show, with her overprotective tyranny being made to seem almost rational". Dubbed Disney's "first passive-aggressive villain" by Helen O'Hara of Empire, the author reviewed, "the fact that [Gothel] is entirely bereft of superpowers and reliant on her considerable wits to keep her going makes her strangely admirable". Writing for the Milwaukee Journal Sentinel, Cathy Jakicic called the character "a great contemporary villain" who "many daughters (and mothers) will find ... funny and a little too familiar". In The New York Times A. O. Scott's opinion, "The Disney pantheon is full of evil stepmothers, though none quite match Mother Gothel for sheer sadistic intensity." According to Jake Coyle of the Southtown Star, Gothel is "one of Disney's best" villains, while Gary Thompson of the Philadelphia Daily News dubbed the character "one reason to love Disney". Michael Smith of the Tulsa World reviewed Gothel as "perfectly wicked as she kills Rapunzel's dreams". Kirk Baird of The Blade identified Gothel as the film's "strongest character". Colin Covert of the Star Tribune commented, "In her own way, Gothel is scarier than Snow White's wicked stepmother" because the character "doesn't cast spells; she's fully capable of manipulating, guilt-tripping and emotionally undermining the girl". Several comparisons have been made between Gothel and the Evil Queen in Disney's Snow White and the Seven Dwarfs (1937), while several critics observed the character's likeness to singer Cher; Peter Howell of the Toronto Star joked that Gothel is "suspiciously Cher-like in her quest for eternal youth".

However, critics were not unanimous in their praise, as some reviewers felt that the character was too passive and tame to be a convincing villain. Jeff Meyers of the Detroit Metro Times wrote that the film's "villain isn't all that villainous", while Tyler Hanley of the Palo Alto Daily News received Gothel as too "one-dimensional and generic". PopMatters' Bill Gibron wrote that, as a villain, Gothel "can't compete with traditional House of Mouse miscreants like Maleficent or Cruella de Vil". Alison Gang of U-T San Diego felt that Gothel was an "annoying" character at times, while USA Todays Claudia Puig wrote that "Gothel plays the role of Rapunzel's loving mom [only] sometimes convincingly". Although Michelle Orange of Movieline enjoyed Gothel's personality to an extent, the author criticized the character in a mixed review that "By reducing Mother Gothel to a vain woman who doesn't want immortality so much as she's determined to keep her profile taut, the film misses the chance to get seriously mythical, and as a result the narrative lacks dramatic impact."

Meanwhile, Murphy's performance has garnered unanimous praise. Lisa Schwarzbaum of Entertainment Weekly highlighted Gothel as "a firecracker" amidst an otherwise "sedate" cast. Joe Morgenstern of The Wall Street Journal wrote that "Donna Murphy does evil deliciously as the voice of Mother Gothel", while Nows Norman Wilner felt that the actress successfully "channelled" Broadway actress Patti LuPone in her performance. Meanwhile, Tim Robey of The Daily Telegraph compared Murphy's performance to actress Julie Andrews, writing, "the Julie-Andrews-on-stimulants vocal stylings of Broadway star Donna Murphy ... makes Mother Gothel into a memorable manipulative diva". Joe Neumaier of the Daily News called Murphy's acting "deliciously mischievous". Meanwhile, Jonathan Crocker of Total Film wrote, "Donna Murphy's vocal performance as the vain, villainous fake-matriarch is marvellous", adding, "her belted-out rendition of 'Mother Knows Best' is easily the film's top musical number". Likewise, the Tampa Bay Times Steve Persall penned, "Nobody but Murphy should be cast as Gothel", continuing, "her 'Mother Knows Best' is a knockout". Simon Reynolds of Digital Spy felt that "Donna Murphy steals the show". Similarly dubbing Murphy a scene-stealer, Canoe.ca's Lindsey Ward wrote that "Murphy ... turns into a giant spectacle with her voice, a powerful force to be reckoned with". David Edelstein of Vulture.com hailed Murphy as "Broadway's gift to animated movies", praising in particular the actress' delivery of "the movie's best line: "Oh, so I'm the bad guy now?” Quickflix deemed Murphy "wonderful", while Stephen Witty of The Star-Ledger called her "terrific". Sandie Angulo Chen of Common Sense Media opined, "As for the dramatic tension, it's best in the form of Mother Gothel – brilliantly played by Murphy, whose signature Broadway voice ... adds the necessary punch". Chen added that Gothel "is ... a personal favorite" while comparing the character to Cher and actress Sophia Loren. The A.V. Clubs Tasha Robinson wrote that Gothel was "magnificently voiced by star Murphy". Murphy's performance of "Mother Knows Best" has also been very positively received, with critics again comparing the actress to Julie Andrews. While calling Gothel's voice "to die for", Peter Travers of Rolling Stone deemed her performance of the song "comic bliss". Linda Cook of the Quad-City Times penned that the song was "belted out wonderfully by Murphy and makes the purchase of the soundtrack worthwhile". Marjorie Baumgarten of The Austin Chronicle opined, "Murphy brings stage showmanship to her musical interludes as Mother Gothel, which drip with sarcasm and biting wit." Slant Magazines Christian Blauvelt, who felt that the film's songs lacked as a result of Moore's "pop-star vocals", happened to very much enjoy Gothel's performances, writing, "when Broadway vet Murphy takes to scaling Menken's octave-climbing melodies like a vocal escalator, it's a different story". Calling Gothel "one of the most potent schemers in the Disney canon", Times Richard Corliss felt that Murphy's performance was worthy of a Tony Award for Best Actress, concluding, "no one can summon the malice in humor, and the fun in pain, like this prima Donna". In his review of the film's soundtrack, James Christopher Monger of AllMusic wrote that both "Moore and Murphy take on the lion's share of the work here, and both deliver the goods".

IGN ranked Mother Gothel fourth on their list of "the 12 Disney Villainesses". In a list of the thirty-three greatest Disney villains conducted by E!, Mother Gothel was ranked twenty-fifth.

References

Disney animated villains
Female characters in animation
Female film villains
Female video game villains
Film characters introduced in 2010
Fictional characters who use magic
Fictional kidnappers
Tangled characters
Animated characters introduced in 2010